Marzena Wysocka (born 17 February 1969) is a female discus thrower from Poland. Her personal best throw is 64.57 metres, achieved in June 2005 in Warszawa.

She finished fifth at the 2002 European Championships and eighth at the 2005 World Athletics Final. She competed at the World Championships in 1999, 2003 and 2005 without reaching the finals.

Achievements

External links

1969 births
Living people
Polish female discus throwers
People from Siedlce County
Sportspeople from Masovian Voivodeship